Villa Mascardi is a village and municipality in Río Negro Province in Argentina. It is named after the 17th century Jesuit Nicolás Mascardi who was active in the Nahuel Huapi area. Villa Mascardi lies at the shores of Mascardi Lake.

References

Populated places in Río Negro Province
Nahuel Huapi National Park